Rajsamand Lok Sabha constituency is one of the 25 Lok Sabha (parliamentary) constituencies in Rajasthan state in western India. This constituency came into existence in 2008 as a part of the implementation of delimitation of parliamentary constituencies, based on the recommendations of the Delimitation Commission of India constituted in 2002.

Vidhan Sabha segments
Presently, Rajsamand Lok Sabha constituency comprises eight Vidhan Sabha (legislative assembly) segments. These are:
 
Four assembly segments - Bhim, Kumbhalgarh, Rajsamand and Nathdwara were earlier in erstwhile Udaipur constituency. Two assembly segments - Merta and Degana were earlier in erstwhile Nagaur constituency. Beawar and Jaitaran assembly segments were earlier in erstwhile Ajmer and Pali constituencies respectively.

Members of Lok Sabha 
 Until 2008 : the constituency did not exist.
2009: Gopal Singh, Indian National Congress
2014: Hari Om Singh Rathore, Bharatiya Janata Party
2019: Diya Kumari, Bharatiya Janata Party

Election results

2019 Lok Sabha Election

2014 Lok Sabha Election

2009 Lok Sabha Election

See also
 Rajsamand district
 List of Constituencies of the Lok Sabha

Notes

Lok Sabha constituencies in Rajasthan
Rajsamand district
Constituencies established in 2008